The 1911–12 Trinity Blue and White's basketball team represented Trinity College (later renamed Duke University) during the 1911–12 men's college basketball season. The head coach was Wilbur Wade Card, coaching his seventh season with the Blue and White. The team finished with an overall record of 6–1.

Schedule

|-

References

Duke Blue Devils men's basketball seasons
Duke
1912 in sports in North Carolina
1911 in sports in North Carolina